Millawana Pahalagama  is a sparsely populated locality situated in the Central Province of Sri Lanka which lies in the Asia continent/region. Its neighboring areas include Nagahapola, Welemulla, Kobbewehera, and Kandewatta.

The major cities located in proximity to Millawana Pahalagama are Colombo, Tirunelveli, Nagercoil, and Madurai.

See also
List of towns in Central Province, Sri Lanka

External links

Populated places in Matale District